The 2020 Ligurian regional election took place in Liguria, Italy on 20–21 September 2020. It was originally scheduled to take place on May 31, 2020, but it was delayed due to the coronavirus pandemic in Italy.

The result of the election was an absolute win of the incumbent President of Liguria, Giovanni Toti.

Electoral system
The Regional Council of Liguria is composed of 30 members, plus the president elect. The president elect is the candidate winning a plurality of votes at the election. Within the council, 24 seats are elected in provincial constituencies by proportional representation. The remaining 6 councillors are assigned as a majority bonus if the winning candidate has less than 18 seats, otherwise they are distributed among the losing coalitions.

A single list must get at least 3% of the votes in a province in order to access the proportional distribution of seats, unless the list is connected to a coalition with more than 5% of the vote.

Parties and candidates

Opinion polls

Candidates

Parties

Results

Turnout

See also
2020 Italian regional elections

References

Elections in Liguria
2020 elections in Italy
Ligurian regional election 2020